Warren Stanford Rustand is past chairman of the World Presidents' Organization (WPO aka YPO Gold), Dean of Learning on the Entrepreneurs' Organization (EO) MIT Birthing of Giants Program, and Dean of the EO  Leadership Academy.

He currently serves as the international chairman of L3, an American leadership group focused on one’s contribution during the second half of life.

He is married and has seven children and nineteen grandchildren.

References 

American educators
Ford administration personnel
Living people
1943 births